Kandrian is the headquarters of Kandrian-Gloucester District, West New Britain Province, Papua New Guinea.

See also 
Kandrian Airport
Kandrian Coastal Rural LLG
Kandrian Inland Rural LLG
Kandrian-Gloucester District

Populated places in West New Britain Province